Elections to Croydon Council in London, England were held on 4 May 2006.  The whole council was up for election for the first time since the 2002 election.  The Labour Party lost control of the council to the Conservative Party for the first time since 1994.

Election result

|}

Political make-up

Ward results

A-C

Addiscombe

Ashburton

Bensham Manor

Broad Green

Coulsdon East

Coulsdon West

Croham

F-N

Fairfield

Fieldway

Heathfield

Kenley

New Addington

Norbury

P-S

Purley

Sanderstead

Selhurst

Selsdon and Ballards

Shirley

South Norwood

T-W

Thornton Heath

Upper Norwood

Waddon

West Thornton

Woodside

Wards
There are 24 wards which represent Croydon Council. All Croydon Council seats were up for re-election for the first time since the 2002 elections, during the election on 4 May 2006. Previously Labour held control of the council. In the election, the Conservatives took 10 seats from Labour and 1 from the Liberal Democrats. Since the defection of a Labour councillor to the Conservatives, giving the newly elected council's political composition as:

References
Election report from Croydon Council (Dead link)
OMRLP Croydon Branch

External links
Tories celebrate election victory , Croydon Advertiser, 5 May 2006.
Labour kicked in the ballots, Croydon Guardian, 5 May 2006.
In Search of Selsdon Man, The Guardian, 27 April 2006.
Croydon Conservatives
Croydon Labour councillors
Croydon Co-operative Party
Croydon Green Party

2006
2006 London Borough council elections